The Best of April Wine: Rock Ballads is a compilation album by Canadian rock band April Wine, released in 1981.

Track listing
 "Just Between You and Me"
 "Child's Garden"
 "Like a Lover, Like a Song"
 "You Won't Dance with Me"
 "I Wouldn't Want to Lose Your Love"
 "Rock n' Roll is a Vicious Game"
 "Cum Hear the Band"
 "Comin' Right Down on Top of Me"
 "Marjorie"
 "I'm on Fire for You Baby" (David Elliott)
 "Lovin' You"
 "Wings of Love"

Track listing (CD reissue)
 "Just Between You and Me"
 "Child's Garden"
 "Like a Lover, Like a Song"
 "You Won't Dance with Me"
 "I Wouldn't Want to Lose Your Love"
 "Rock n' Roll is a Vicious Game"
 "Comin' Right Down on Top of Me"
 "Marjorie"
 "Lovin' You"
 "Wings of Love"

Personnel
 Myles Goodwyn – lead & background vocals, guitar, keyboards
 Brian Greenway – vocals, guitar, harmonica
 Gary Moffet – guitar, background vocals
 Jim Clench – vocals, bass
 Steve Lang – bass, background vocals
 Jerry Mercer – drums & percussion, background vocals

Various producers
 Myles Goodwyn – producer
 Mike Stone – producer
 Gene Cornish – producer
 Dino Danelli – producer
 Doug Morris – producer

References

April Wine albums
1981 greatest hits albums
Albums produced by Myles Goodwyn
Albums produced by Mike Stone (record producer)
Aquarius Records (Canada) compilation albums